Felice Pazner Malkin (born 1929) is an Israeli artist.
She is on the faculty of the Society for Humanistic Judaism.

Biography
Felice Pazner Malkin was born in Philadelphia, USA. She immigrated to Israel in 1949. Her first studio was in Jerusalem’s Beit Hakerem neighborhood, where she painted and illustrated books. In 1950 she married Yaakov Malkin. They spent a year in Paris where Felice studied at the Sorbonne and painted at a studio in Bellevue. Her son Irad was born in 1951 in the United States.

Art career
In 1953, Pazner Malkin had her first one-woman show in Tel Aviv. She subsequently exhibited at the Tel Aviv Museum, and produced Israel's first artist-designed theater posters for the Habima, Cameri, and Matateh theater companies.

From 1956 to 1957, Pazner Malkin returned to Paris to study theatrical art and design with Jean-Marie Serreau, and to continue her studio work. The following year, the family moved to Haifa where they stayed until 1971, and where her daughter, Sivan, was born.

Pazner Malkin held several additional one-woman shows during these years as well as contributions to group shows. Her album of drawings inspired by the Song of Songs was published in the book Jonah Jones and the Song of Songs (Haifa, 1966).

Pazner Malkin was a founding member of Beit HaGefen, an Arab–Jewish cultural center in Haifa. She also founded and directed the Beit Rothschild Art School. In 1971 she moved to Jerusalem, where she founded the Jewish-Arab Arts Center for Hebrew University's Buber Institute and remained its director until 1975.

Pazner Malkin's work has is part of the James Michener Collection, in Austin, Texas. A series of drawings by Pazner Malkin on the theme of 'Art as Love' was published in three albums by Massada Press, and accompanied Yaakov Malkin's text in the book Art as Love (Massada, 1975). Pazner Malkin and Yaakov Malkin co-edited the Massada Lexicon of the Arts (1975). Some of Pazner Malkin's  'Jerusalem People' paintings were exhibited  at the American Cultural Center in Jerusalem, and the series appeared in a book published by Bialik Institute. Her 'Paris Vistas' drawings illustrated Yaakov Malkin's Vankaban (a cinematic novel) in 1993.

In 1996, Pazner Malkin designed the documentary exhibition "Jewish Figurative Art: The First 3000 Years" at the International Institute for Secular Humanistic Judaism in Detroit, Michigan.

Published works
"Jewish Art in the Ancient World"

See also
Israeli art

References

External links
 

1929 births
Living people
20th-century Israeli women artists
21st-century Israeli women artists
Artists from Philadelphia
Israeli women painters
Israeli Humanistic Jews